Pipunculus lichtwardti is a species of fly in the family Pipunculidae.

Distribution
Great Britain, Hungary, Latvia, Slovakia.

References

Pipunculidae
Insects described in 1981
Diptera of Europe